Central Christian Church is a historic church at 2611 Wesley Street in Greenville, Texas.

It was built in 1899 and added to the National Register of Historic Places in 2004.

See also

National Register of Historic Places listings in Hunt County, Texas
Recorded Texas Historic Landmarks in Hunt County

References

External links

Churches on the National Register of Historic Places in Texas
Gothic Revival church buildings in Texas
Churches completed in 1899
19th-century Protestant churches
Churches in Hunt County, Texas
National Register of Historic Places in Hunt County, Texas
Recorded Texas Historic Landmarks